The National Republican Air Force (ANR) was the air force of the Italian Social Republic, a World War II German puppet state in Italy.

Description

This air force was tasked with defending the industrial areas of the region, intercepting Allied bombers en route to southern Germany and the allied and occupied territories of the Axis, and giving close support to German and Italian land forces. Later during the war various units served with German forces based at Spilve, near Riga (Reichskommissariat Ostland), on the northern Russian Front, amongst others in the central and south area (Crimea) on the front.

The ANR, after the 1943 armistice that divided Italy, received numbers of Italian aircraft, later augmented with their own local production, and further aircraft from Germany. This force was opposed to the Italian Co-Belligerent Air Force (Aviazione Cobelligerante Italiana, or ACI, or Aeronautica Cobelligerante del Sud), the Italian pro-Allied air force, though they never actually met in combat.

Combat operations began in December 1943, leading, in the following January, to the attack performed by the 1st Squadriglia "Asso di Bastoni", against a formation of US P-38 Lightnings, three of which were shot down. Starting from June 1944, ANR started to receive Messerschmitt Bf 109G-6s for its fighter force. From October 1944 to February 1945, when the 1st Fighter Group "Asso di Bastoni" returned from training in Germany, 2nd Fighter Group "Gigi Tre Osei" was the only ANR fighter unit active in the defence of the northern Italian territory. From mid-1944, the casualty ratio started to outbalance the victories of the Italian pilots. The last interception missions were carried out on 19 April 1945.

Bomber units included the Gruppo Aerosiluranti "Buscaglia Faggioni", led by Carlo Faggioni and named after Carlo Emanuele Buscaglia who, at the time, was presumed dead but was instead held in an Allied Prisoner of War camp and later fought with the Aeronautica Cobelligerante. The unit, using old Savoia-Marchetti SM.79, performed several raids against the Allied bridgehead of Anzio. Its only two recorded victories were the sinking of a British transport ship north of Benghazi (at the time the group was based in Greece), and an enemy cargo vessel off Rimini on 5 February 1945.

The first Chief of Staff of the ANR was Colonel Ernesto Botto, replaced in March 1944 by General Arrigo Tessari, who in turn was replaced by Colonel Ruggero Bonomi in August of the same year.

Units 
 1° Gruppo Caccia Asso di Bastoni
1ª Squadriglia "Asso di bastoni"
2ª Squadriglia "Vespa incacchiata"
3ª Squadriglia "Arciere"
2° Gruppo Caccia "Gigi Tre Osei"
1ª Squadriglia “Gigi Tre Osei”
2ª Squadriglia “Diavoli Rossi”
3ª Squadriglia “Gamba di Ferro”, later "Diavoli"
3° Gruppo Caccia "Francesco Baracca" (never become operational)
Squadriglia complementare d’allarme “Montefusco-Bonet”.
Gruppo Aerosiluranti Buscaglia Faggioni
 1° Gruppo Aerotrasporti "Trabucchi". Fought under Luftwaffe command in the Eastern Front, and was disbanded in the Summer 1944
2° Gruppo Aerotrasporti "Terraciano" (performed only training)

Aircraft 

Ambrosini SAI.2S
Ambrosini SAI.107
AVIA FL.3
Breda Ba.25
Breda Ba.39
Breda Ba.88 Lince
Breda Ba.88M Lince
CANSA FC.20bis
CANT Z.501 Gabbiano
CANT Z.506B Airone
CANT Z.511
CANT Z.1007bis Alcione
CANT Z.1018 Leone
Caproni Ca.133
Caproni Ca.164
Caproni Ca.310 Libbecio
Caproni-Vizzola F.5
Dornier Do 217 J-2
Fieseler Fi 156 C-2 Storch
Fiat CR.32 bis.
Fiat G.8
Fiat BR.20M Cicogna
Fiat G.18V
Fiat G.50bis Freccia
Fiat RS.14B
Fiat CR.42AS Falco
Fiat G.12T
Fiat G.55/I (Serie I) Centauro
Junkers Ju 87 B-1 Picchiatello 
Junkers Ju 87 B-2 Trop.
Junkers Ju 87 R-2 
Junkers Ju 87 R-5 Trop.
Junkers Ju 88 A-4
Macchi MC.200 Saetta
Macchi MC.202 Folgore
Macchi MC.205V Veltro
Meridionali Ro.41
Messerschmitt Bf 109 F-2
Messerschmitt Bf 109 G-6
Messerschmitt Bf 109 G-10
Messerschmitt Bf 109 G-12
Messerschmitt Bf 109 K-4
Messerschmitt Bf 110 C-4
Messerschmitt Bf 110 G-4
Nardi FN.305
Piaggio P.108B
Reggiane Re.2001 Serie III Falco II
Reggiane Re.2002 Ariete
Reggiane Re.2005 Sagittario
SAIMAN 202
Savoia-Marchetti SM.75 Marsupiale
Savoia-Marchetti SM.79 Sparviero
Savoia-Marchetti SM.81 Pipistrello
Savoia-Marchetti SM.82 Marsupiale
Savoia-Marchetti SM.84
Savoia-Marchetti SM.95

Ranks

See also
 Regia Aeronautica
 Aeronautica Cobelligerante del Sud
 Esercito Nazionale Repubblicano
 Marina Nazionale Repubblicana

Sources

 D'Amico, F. and G. Valentini. Regia Aeronautica Vol. 2: Pictorial History of the Aeronautica Nazionale Repubblicana and the Italian Co-Belligerent Air Frce, 1943-1945. Carrollton, Texas: Squadron/Signal Publications, Inc., 1986. .
 Sgarlato, Nico. Italian Aircraft of World War II. Warren, Michigan: Squadron/Signal Publications, Inc., 1979. .
 Matricardi, Paolo. The Concise History of Aviation. New York: Crescent Books, 1985. 

Military units and formations established in 1943
Italian Air Force
Military units and formations of Italy in World War II
Military units and formations disestablished in 1945
1943 establishments in Italy
1945 disestablishments in Italy
Italian Social Republic
Disbanded air forces